The 1st Northeast Missouri Cavalry, or 1st NE Missouri Cavalry was a Confederate Army regiment during the American Civil War. One of the commanders was Colonel Joseph C. Porter, who led 125 men through the Battle of Moore's Mill. This regiment was known for its guerrilla warfare.

Battle of Cherry Grove
This battle was in Marion County, Missouri.

Battle of Memphis

This battle was on June 6, 1862, in Scotland County, Missouri.

Battle of Vassar Hill
This battle was on July 19, 1862, and was the largest Civil War battle in Scotland County of North East Missouri.

The battle took place on a wooden bridge over the North Fork of the Fabius River. The Pierce's Mill area is a few hundred yards to the northwest and upstream of the bridge crossing. Oak Ridge is south across and all along the bottom land/timbered hill interface running northwest to southeast following the stream valley.

The Battle of Vassar Hill was fought between the Federal forces of Missouri and the confederates. Col. Porter assembled his 125 riders at Memphis, gave them the plan/orders of the day and rode to the Pierce's Mill area. Looking for Porter's riders was a 280-man Federal detachment composed of a battalion of the 11th Missouri Cavalry (the Merrill Horse) and a detachment of the 11th MO State Militia. Major Clopper was in command of the Federal riders.

Battle of Florida

This battle was on July 22, 1862, in Monroe County, Missouri.

Battle of Santa Fe
This battle was on July 24, 1862, in Monroe County, Missouri.

Battle of Moore's Mill

This battle was on July 28, 1862, in Callaway County, Missouri, with a Union victory.

Battle of Newark
This battle was on August 1, 1862, in Knox County, Missouri.

Battle of Kirksville

This battle was on August 6, 1862, in Kirksville, Adair County, Missouri with a Union victory.

See also
List of Missouri Confederate Civil War units

References

Units and formations of the Confederate States Army from Missouri